The Edmonton Eskimos defeat the Montreal Alouettes in the first Grey Cup held in the west. This was also the first year that the Grey Cup was open to professional teams only, as the amateur Ontario Rugby Football Union was not invited to compete in an inter-union playdown, leaving only the Eastern Canadian Interprovincial Rugby Football Union and the Western Canadian Western Interprovincial Football Union to compete for the Canadian championship.

Canadian Football News in 1955
For 45 years the Grey Cup classic was an event held exclusively in the province of Ontario, with the one exception in 1931 when the game was staged in Montreal. This all changed in 1955 when the game was awarded to Vancouver, B.C. The then largest crowd in the history of organized team sports in Canada packed Empire Stadium to witness the Edmonton Eskimos defeat the Montreal Alouettes. The 39,417 in attendance remained a Grey Cup record until 1976.

The Interprovincial Rugby Football Union (IRFU) allowed the third place team to qualify for a playoff berth. The Grey Cup had a gross revenue of $198,000.

In January 1955, the Western Interprovincial Football Union (WIFU) announced that a playoff game with the Ontario Rugby Football Union (ORFU) was no longer desired. The WIFU and IRFU both scheduled their games so as not to leave an open date for the traditional game with the ORFU. At the March meeting of the CRU, the ORFU withdrew from Grey Cup competition for 1955. 1955 became the first year that only the IRFU and the WIFU competed for the Grey Cup.

Montreal's Tex Coulter became the first player to win the Most Outstanding Lineman Award.

Regular season

Final regular season standings
Note: GP = Games Played, W = Wins, L = Losses, T = Ties, PF = Points For, PA = Points Against, Pts = Points

Bold text means that they have clinched the playoffs.
Edmonton and Montreal both have first round byes.

Grey Cup playoffs
Note: All dates in 1955

Semifinals

Winnipeg won the total-point series by 24–16. The Blue Bombers will play the Edmonton Eskimos in the WIFU Finals.

The Argonauts will play the Montreal Alouettes in the Eastern finals.

Final

Edmonton wins the best of three series 2–0. The Eskimos will advance to the Grey Cup game.

The Alouettes will advance to the Grey Cup game.

Playoff bracket

Grey Cup Championship

Note: IRFU and Eastern Final dates are not confirmed, however since [1] the regular season ended October 29 in the West, and November 5 in the East, and [2] WIFU playoff dates, as well as the Grey Cup date are accurate, it is reasonable to assume the above dates are accurate.

Canadian Football Leaders
 CFL Passing Leaders
 CFL Rushing Leaders
 CFL Receiving Leaders

1955 Eastern (Interprovincial Rugby Football Union) All-Stars
Offence
QB – Sam Etcheverry, Montreal Alouettes
RB – Lou Kusserow*, Hamilton Tiger-Cats
RB – Pat Abbruzzi, Montreal Alouettes
RB – Tom Tracy, Ottawa Rough Riders
E  – Red O'Quinn, Montreal Alouettes
E  – Al Pfeifer, Toronto Argonauts
FW – Joey Pal, Montreal Alouettes
C  – Tommy Hugo, Montreal Alouettes
OG – Bill Albright, Toronto Argonauts
OG – Herb Trawick, Montreal Alouettes
OT – Tex Coulter, Montreal Alouettes
OT – Billy Shipp, Toronto ArgonautsDefence
DT – Tex Coulter, Montreal Alouettes
DT – Billy Shipp*, Toronto Argonauts
DE – Pete Neumann, Hamilton Tiger-Cats
DE – Doug McNichol, Montreal Alouettes
DG – Vince Scott, Hamilton Tiger-Cats
DG – Eddie Bevan, Hamilton Tiger-Cats
LB – Frank Dempsey, Ottawa Rough Riders
LB – Tommy Hugo*, Montreal Alouettes
DB – Hal Patterson, Montreal Alouettes
DB – Avatus Stone, Ottawa Rough Riders
DB – John Fedosoff, Hamilton Tiger-Cats
DB – Lou Kusserow*, Hamilton Tiger-Cats

NOTE: The following players were selected to the All-Star team as replacements for players who would have had to play both ways in the Shrine Game (denoted with an *):

RB – Corky Tharp, Toronto Argonauts
DT – Jim Staton, Montreal Alouettes
LB – John Blaicher, Montreal Alouettes
LB – Juan Sheridan, Montreal Alouettes
DB  – Bobby Simpson, Ottawa Rough Riders

2nd Team Offence
QB – Bob Celeri, Kitchener-Waterloo Dutchmen
RB – Hal Patterson, Montreal Alouettes
RB – Corky Tharp, Toronto Argonauts
RB – Avatus Stone, Ottawa Rough Riders
E  – Doug McNichol, Montreal Alouettes
E  – Pete Neumann, Hamilton Tiger-Cats
FW – Ron Stewart, Queen's University
C  – Frank Dempsey, Ottawa Rough Riders
OG – Eddie Bevan, Hamilton Tiger-Cats
OG – Vince Scott, Hamilton Tiger-Cats
OT – Jim Hughes, Queen's University
OT – Ray Collins, Hamilton Tiger-Cats

1955 Western (Western Interprovincial Football Union) All-Stars
Offence
QB – Jackie Parker, Edmonton Eskimos
RB – Ken Carpenter, Saskatchewan Roughriders
RB – Gerry James, Winnipeg Blue Bombers
RB – Normie Kwong, Edmonton Eskimos
E  – Stan Williams, Saskatchewan Roughriders
E  – Willie Roberts, Calgary Stampeders
FW – Leo Lewis*, Winnipeg Blue Bombers
C  – Kurt Burris*, Edmonton Eskimos
OG – Harry Langford*, Calgary Stampeders
OG – Art Walker, Edmonton Eskimos
OT – Dale Meinert, Edmonton Eskimos
OT – Buddy Tinsley, Winnipeg Blue BombersDefence
DT – Dick Huffman, Winnipeg Blue Bombers
DT – Dale Meinert*, Edmonton Eskimos
DE – Frank Anderson*, Edmonton Eskimos
DE – Gordon Sturtridge, Saskatchewan Roughriders
DG – Floyd Harraway*, Winnipeg Blue Bombers
DG – Bob Levenhagen, British Columbia Lions
LB – Kurt Burris, Edmonton Eskimos
LB – Ted Tully*, Edmonton Eskimos
DB – Rollie Miles, Edmonton Eskimos
DB – Bobby Marlow, Saskatchewan Roughriders
DB – Tom Casey, Winnipeg Blue Bombers
DB – Rupe Andrews*, Edmonton Eskimos

NOTE: The following players were selected to the All-Star team as replacements for players who would have had to play both ways, or were injured, in the Shrine Game (denoted with an *):

FW – Lynn Bottoms, Calgary Stampeders
C – Mel Beckett, Saskatchewan Roughriders
OG – Frank Morris, Edmonton Eskimos
DG – Ron Atchison, Saskatchewan Roughriders
DT – Martin Ruby, Saskatchewan Roughriders
DE – Norm Fieldgate, British Columbia Lions
LB – Mike King, Edmonton Eskimos
DB – Gord Rowland, Winnipeg Blue Bombers

1955 Ontario Rugby Football Union All-Stars
NOTE: During this time most players played both ways, so the All-Star selections do not distinguish between some offensive and defensive positions.
QB – Bob Celeri, Kitchener-Waterloo Dutchmen
RB – Cookie Gilchrist, Kitchener-Waterloo Dutchmen
RB – John Jacobs, Sarnia Imperials
RB – Sam Laverty, Toronto Balmy Beach Beachers
E  – Eric Graham, Sarnia Imperials
E  – Gerry McTaggart, Kitchener-Waterloo Dutchmen
FW – Carl Totzke, Kitchener-Waterloo Dutchmen
C  – Bruce Mattingly, Sarnia Imperials
OG – Ed Stowe, Sarnia Imperials
OG – Larry Cardonick, Sarnia Imperials
OT – Jay Fry, Kitchener-Waterloo Dutchmen
OT – Oatten Fisher, Toronto Balmy Beach Beachers
OT – Jim Burr, Sarnia Imperials

1955 Canadian Football Awards
 Most Outstanding Player Award – Pat Abbruzzi (RB), Montreal Alouettes
 Most Outstanding Canadian Award – Normie Kwong (RB), Edmonton Eskimos
 Outstanding Lineman Award – Tex Coulter (OT/DT), Montreal Alouettes
 Jeff Russel Memorial Trophy (IRFU MVP) – Avatus Stone (DB), Ottawa Rough Riders
 Jeff Nicklin Memorial Trophy (WIFU MVP) - Ken Carpenter (RB), Saskatchewan Roughriders
 Gruen Trophy (IRFU Rookie of the Year) - Ed Mularchyk (E), Ottawa Rough Riders
 Dr. Beattie Martin Trophy (WIFU Rookie of the Year) - Harry Lunn (HB), Saskatchewan Roughriders
 Imperial Oil Trophy (ORFU MVP) - Bob Celeri - Kitchener-Waterloo Dutchmen

References

 
Canadian Football League seasons